Live at Carnegie Hall was the fifth solo album by Dory Previn, released in 1973 by United Artists. 

The album was recorded live at Carnegie Hall, New York City on 18 April 1973. It was her only live album, and was originally released as a double LP.  It drew on her four previous UA solo albums, and was her last release on the label.

Track listing
All tracks composed by Dory Previn

"Mythical Kings and Iguanas"
"Scared to Be Alone"
"I Ain't His Child"
"I Dance and Dance and Smile and Smile"
"Esther's First Communion"
"The Veterans Big Parade/Play It Again Sam"
"Don't Put Him Down"
"Yada Yada la Scala"
"The Lady with the Braid"
"The Midget's Lament"
"Left Hand Lost"
"When a Man Wants a Woman"
"Angels and Devils the Following Day"
"Mary C. Brown and the Hollywood Sign"
"Be Careful, Baby, Be Careful"
"Twenty Mile Zone"
"Michael Michael"
"Moon Rock"
"Going Home (Mythical Kings and Iguanas)"

Personnel
Bryan Garofalo – Bass
Peter Jameson – Guitar
Tom Keene – Piano, Harpsichord, Electric Piano
Bill Lincoln – Guitar
Dory Previn – Vocals, Guitar
West Venet – Vocals
Waddy Wachtel – Guitar, Dobro

Production
Producer – Nick Venet
Engineer – Brooks Arthur
Assistant engineer – Larry Alexander 
Liner notes – Will Friedwald, Paul Pelletier
Production coordination – Norma Goldstein
Art direction and design – Elizabeth Yoon
Design and photography – Mike Salisbury, Lloyd Ziff
Re-issue producer – Hugh Fordin

References

Dory Previn albums
Albums produced by Nick Venet
1973 live albums
United Artists Records live albums
Albums recorded at Carnegie Hall